Wynne-Jones, Wynn-Jones and Wynne Jones are variations of a surname. "Wynne Jones" can also be a middle name and surname.

Notable people with the surnames include:

Wynne-Jones
 William Wynne-Jones, Baron Wynne-Jones (1903–1982), a British chemist 
 Tim Wynne-Jones (born 1948), an English–Canadian author 
 Nancy Wynne-Jones (1922–2006), a Welsh and Irish artist
 Ros Wynne-Jones, journalist and author
 Vere Wynne-Jones (1950–2006), broadcast journalist
 Grace Wynne-Jones, journalist and writer
 Llewelyn Wynne-Jones (1859-1936), Welsh Anglican priest

Wynn-Jones
 Michael Wynn-Jones is a Welsh-born writer, editor and publisher

Wynne Jones
 David Wynne Jones, Australian Scout leader
 Diana Wynne Jones (1934–2011), British writer 
 Owen Wynne Jones (1828–1870), Welsh clergyman
 Ivor Wynne Jones (1927–2007), Welsh journalist 
 John Wynne Jones (1803–1888), Welsh Anglican priest 
 Gethin Wynne Jones (born 1995), Welsh professional footballer

Surnames of Welsh origin
Compound surnames